Nwazuluwa Onuekwuke "Zulu" Sofola (22 June 1935 – 5 September 1995) was the first published female Nigerian playwright and dramatist. Sofola was also a university teacher and became the first female Professor of Theater Arts in Africa.

Biography

Nwazuluwa Onuekwuke Sofola was born in the former Bendel State to Nwaugbade Okwumabua and Chief Ogana Okwumabua who were Igbo from Issele-Uku, Aniocha North Local Government Area, presently in Delta State. She attended Federal Government Primary School in Asaba and the Baptist Girls High School in Agbor all in Delta State.  Due to her outstanding performance in school, she was awarded a scholarship to complete her high school education in Nashville, Tennessee, USA. Spending her adolescence and early womanhood in the US, she studied at Southern Baptist Seminary, earned a BA in English at Virginia Union University in Richmond, Virginia in 1959. She obtained her MA in Drama (Play writing and Production) from The Catholic University of America in Washington DC in the year 1965. She returned to Nigeria in 1966, and became a lecturer in the Department of Theatre Arts at the University of Ibadan, Oyo State, where she obtained a PhD in Theatre Arts (Tragic Theory) in 1977.

Career 
Her plays "range from historical tragedy to domestic comedy and use both traditional and modern African setting". She uses "elements of magic, myth and ritual to examine conflicts between traditionalism and modernism in which male supremacy persists." She was considered one of the most distinguished women in Nigerian literature.
She remains a source of inspiration to young African writers.
Sofola's most frequently performed plays are Wedlock of the Gods (1972) and The Sweet Trap (1977), She died in 1995 at the age of 60.

Achievements 

 Scholarly awards and distinctions both nationally and internationally.
 Recipient of a Fulbright Scholarship.
 Represented Nigeria at the first International Women Playwrights Conference.

Selected works

 The Deer Hunter and The Hunter's Pearl (1969), London: Evans Brothers.
 The Disturbed Peace of Christmas (1971), Ibadan: Daystar Press.
 Wedlock of the Gods (1972), Ibadan: Evans.
 The Operators, Ibadan: Ibadan University, 1973.
 King Emene: Tragedy of a Rebellion (1974), Heinemann Educational Books. 
 The Wizard of Law (1975), Evans Bros. 
 The Sweet Trap (1977); Ibadan: Oxford University Press. 
 Old Wines Are Tasty (1981), Ibadan: Oxford University Press. 
 Memories in the Moonlight (1986), Ibadan: Evans Brothers.
 Queen Omu-ako of Oligbo, Buffalo: Paul Robeson Theatre, 1989.
 Eclipso and the Fantasia, Illorin, Nigeria: 1990.
 The Showers, Illorin, Nigeria: 1991.
 Song of a Maiden: A Play, Illorin, Nigeria: Heinemann, 1992.
 Lost Dreams and Other Plays, Ibadan: Heinemann, 1992.

Further reading
 Gikandi, Simon (2002), Encyclopedia of African Literature, Routledge.  - p. 502
 Gilbert, H. (1996), Post-Colonial Drama: Theory, Practice, Politics, Routledge.  - p. 183 (on Sofola's use of proverbs).
 Kolawole, M. E. M. (1999), Zulu Sofola: her life & her works, Caltop Publications (Nigeria). 
http://www.critical-stages.org/15/nigeria-the-challenge-of-and-for-the-female-playwright/

References

External links
 zulusofola.com ′Zulu Sofola official website.
 Zulu Sofola at Black Plays Archive, National Theatre.

Catholic University of America alumni
University of Ibadan alumni
Igbo dramatists and playwrights
1935 births
1995 deaths
Nigerian dramatists and playwrights
20th-century Nigerian writers
Virginia Union University alumni
English-language writers from Nigeria
Women dramatists and playwrights
20th-century Nigerian dramatists and playwrights
Academic staff of the University of Ilorin
Academic staff of the University of Ibadan
Igbo academics
Nigerian women academics
History of women in Nigeria
Southern Baptist Theological Seminary alumni
Nigerian expatriates in the United States
20th-century Nigerian women writers